Mount Giles is a mainly snow-covered mountain (820 m) located 5 nautical miles (9 km) south-southeast of Lynch Point on the coast of Marie Byrd Land. The mountain is the highest elevation on the divide between the seaward ends of Frostman Glacier and Hull Glacier. 

Discovered on aerial flights from the West Base of the United States Antarctic Service (USAS) in 1940, and named for Walter R. Giles technical sergeant, United States Marine Corps (USMC), copilot and radio operator on some of these flights.

References

Mountains of Marie Byrd Land